William Alexander Wade (22 March 1901 – 23 August 1958) was an English professional footballer who played in the Football League for Preston North End, West Ham United and Wigan Borough. He played as an inside right.

Playing career
Wade was born in Jarrow. He made his debut in the Football League with Preston North End. He was a loyal player, representing Preston North End 139 times.

He began the 1931–32 season with Wigan Borough. After twelve matches, the club folded and its results were expunged from official records. Wade had played in eight of those twelve, including their last ever league game, a 5–0 defeat at Wrexham on 24 October 1931. Together with Wigan teammates Alf Oakes and Tommy Moon, Wade signed for non-league Frickley Colliery. He had a brief stint with Nelson before retiring.

References

1901 births
1958 deaths
Sportspeople from Jarrow
Footballers from Tyne and Wear
English footballers
Association football inside forwards
Jarrow F.C. players
Preston North End F.C. players
West Ham United F.C. players
Wigan Borough F.C. players
Frickley Athletic F.C. players
Nelson F.C. players
English Football League players